Eupithecia galapagosata is a moth in the family Geometridae. It is found on the Galapagos Islands.

References

Moths described in 1995
galapagosata
Moths of South America